Mary Pickford (1892–1979) was a Canadian-American motion picture actress, producer, and writer. During the silent film era she became one of the first great celebrities of the cinema and a popular icon known to the public as "America's Sweetheart".

Pickford was born Gladys Louise Smith in Toronto and began acting on stage in 1900. She started her film career in the United States in 1909. Initially with the Biograph film company, she moved to the Independent Motion Picture Company (IMP) in 1911, then briefly to the Majestic Film Company later that same year, followed by a return to Biograph in 1912. After appearing in over 150 short films during her years with these studios she began working in features with Zukor's Famous Players Film Company, a studio which eventually became part of Paramount Pictures. By 1916 Pickford's popularity had climbed to the point that she was awarded a contract that made her a partner with Zukor and allowed her to produce her own films. In 1919 Pickford teamed with D.W. Griffith, Charlie Chaplin, and Douglas Fairbanks to create United Artists, an organization designed to distribute their own films. Following the release of Secrets (1933) Pickford retired from acting in motion pictures. However, she remained active as a producer for several years afterwards. She sold her stock in United Artists in 1956.

Pickford won two Academy Awards in her lifetime. The first was in 1929 when she won the award for Best Actress for her performance in Coquette. The second was in 1975 when she was presented with an Honorary Academy Award "in recognition of her unique contributions to the film industry and the development of film as an artistic medium". As of 2009 two of Pickford's films have been added to the National Film Registry: Tess of the Storm Country (1914) and The Poor Little Rich Girl (1917). For her work in motion pictures Pickford received a star on the Hollywood Walk of Fame located at 6280 Hollywood Boulevard.

Unless otherwise referenced, the information presented here is derived from the web site of the American Film Institute, the filmography prepared by Library of Congress historian Christel Schmidt, and the books Mary Pickford Rediscovered by Kevin Brownlow, Mary Pickford: From Here to Hollywood by Scott Eyman, and Pickford: The Woman Who Made Hollywood by Eileen Whitfield.

Short films

Biograph (1909) 
Mary Pickford began working for the American Mutoscope and Biograph Company in April 1909 and remained with the company until the end of 1910. During this period Pickford made 43 films released in 1909, plus a 44th film that was not released. Most of these films are one-reelers while the remaining films are split-reelers (i.e. one of two films released on the same reel).

Biograph (1910) 
Pickford appeared in 34 Biograph films released in 1910. All of these films are one-reelers.

Biograph (1911) 
Pickford left the Biograph Company at the end of 1910. The last films that she made for them before her departure were released in early 1911. All of these five films are one-reelers.

Selig (1911) 
In a 1913 interview Pickford claimed to have written two screenplays for the Selig Polyscope Company. Neither film is known to survive.

IMP (1911–1912) 
In December 1910 Carl Laemmle signed Pickford to his Independent Motion Picture Company (IMP). All of her IMP titles are one-reelers. The names of Pickford's characters are given if known. Only 13 of Pickford's 41 IMP films are known to survive complete, while fragments of two others exist.

Majestic (1911–1912) 
After leaving IMP, Pickford signed with Harry H. Aiken's Majestic Film Company. During her brief time with this studio she made five one-reelers. Only one of these films is known to survive.

Biograph (1912–1913) 
Pickford returned to the Biograph Company in January 1912, where she remained until the end of the year. Except where noted all 26 films from this period are one-reelers.

Features

State rights (1913–1914) 
After leaving Biograph at the end of 1912, Pickford returned to stage acting in the Broadway production of David Belasco's play A Good Little Devil. In May 1913 she resumed acting in motion pictures when she signed with Adolph Zukor's Famous Players Film Company. The first five features she made for Zukor were released in the United States on a state rights basis, where regional organizations in each state handled the distribution of each film. Only one of these films is known to survive complete.

Paramount (1914–1916) 
In 1914 Paramount Pictures began handling the release of Zukor's Famous Players Film Company. Pickford made 17 features prior to beginning with Artcraft. Ten of these films survive complete while six are lost and one survives incomplete.

Artcraft (1916–1918) 
Pickford signed a new contract with Adolph Zukor in June 1916. Among the agreements in the contract was that she would now be producing her own films and they would be distributed through a special division of Paramount Pictures called Artcraft. Pickford made 13 films for Artcraft of which 11 survive complete.

War propaganda (1917–1918) 
During World War I Pickford appeared in four short propaganda films.

First National (1918–1920) 
In November 1918 Pickford ended her contractual obligations with Adolph Zukor and Paramount. She then signed a three-picture deal with First National to distribute her productions.

United Artists (silent films, 1920–1927) 
In 1919 Pickford co-founded United Artists with Charlie Chaplin, D.W. Griffith, and Douglas Fairbanks. Pickford starred in 11 silent films for United Artists release and co-produced three films starring her brother, Jack Pickford, and one with their sister, Lottie Pickford. Mary Pickford also made unbilled cameo appearances in three other films during this time.

United Artists (sound films, 1929–1949) 
Pickford starred in four sound films (excluding the uncompleted Forever Yours). After Secrets, her final film as an actress, she continued working as a producer, including two films in collaboration with Jesse L. Lasky. In 1945, she and her third husband, Charles "Buddy" Rogers, co-founded Comet Productions to produce "B" pictures for United Artists.  Her role as producer in these later films was generally uncredited.

Cameos and erroneous credits

Cameo appearances in short films 
Pickford made cameo appearances as herself in the following short films:

Erroneous credits 
Three Biograph titles, The Usurer (August 15, 1910), The Affair of an Egg (September 1, 1910), and Examination Day at School (September 2, 1910), and two IMP titles, At the Duke's Command (February 6, 1911) and From the Bottom of the Sea (October 20, 1911), have been erroneously listed in Mary Pickford filmographies. Pickford historian Christel Schmidt has confirmed that the actress does not appear in these films. The Internet Movie Database lists Pickford as appearing in the Biograph shorts entitled Mrs. Jones Entertains (January 9, 1909), The Fascinating Mrs. Francis (January 21, 1909) and The Deception (March 22, 1909). However, Pickford did not begin with Biograph until the end of April 1909. Mary Pickford is credited with appearing in the movie Pictureland in 1911 but a recently discovered copy shows that she is not in the film. The stars are Isabel Rae and King Baggot and the film was likely directed by Thomas Ince.

See also
 Timeline of Mary Pickford

Footnotes

References 
 Main sources
 
  (Originally titled Mary Pickford – America's Sweetheart)
 
 
 Petersen, Anne Helen (2014). Pickford&Fairbanks: American Royalty. Penguin.

 Further reading

External links 
  Note: Type "Mary Pickford" into Nominee category.
 
 
 

Actress filmographies

American filmographies
Canadian filmographies